The 2020–21 Road Safety World Series was the inaugural season, an international T20 cricket league, which featured former international cricketers and was organized by the Road Safety World Series (RSWS) organization to raise awareness about road safety. The 2020–21 edition of the series featured players from India, England, Sri Lanka, West Indies, South Africa, Australia and Bangladesh. Sunil Gavaskar, former India captain, was the commissioner of the series, while Sachin Tendulkar was its brand ambassador.

Background 
The Road Safety World Series was founded by Ravi Gaikwad and approved by the BCCI. The first edition of the tournament began in March 2020, with the tournament taking place at venues in Mumbai, India and Pune. Sachin Tendulkar (India Legends), Brian Lara (West Indies Legends) Tillakaratne Dilshan (Sri Lanka Legends), Brett Lee (Australia Legends), and Jonty Rhodes (South Africa Legends) were the captains of their respective teams. The tournament was to be played in a round-robin format with the top two finishers playing the final.

On 13 March 2020, as a result of an advisory by Indian Government following the global coronavirus pandemic, the remaining seven matches were rescheduled to a later date. Soon, it was decided that the remaining seven matches of the tournament would be played behind closed doors in DY Patil Stadium; but then the tournament was indefinitely postponed.

Instead of starting afresh in 2021, the organizers opted to resume the previous edition, paused after only four games. Six teams took part in the tournament. They were India Legends, Sri Lanka Legends, South Africa Legends, West Indies Legends, Bangladesh Legends, and England Legends.

Bangladesh Legends and England Legends were added to the tournament after Australia Legends opted out due to COVID-19. Mohammad Rafique (Bangladesh Legends) and Kevin Pietersen (England Legends) were captains of their respective teams.

Venues

The 11 matches were initially scheduled to start on 7 March 2020 and played in Wankhede Stadium in Mumbai, DY Patil Stadium in Navi Mumbai, and MCA Stadium in Pune with the final supposed to be played on March 22, 2020, in Pune. In 2021, with the arrival of COVID-19 vaccine, the remaining tournament was held at Shaheed Veer Narayan Singh International Cricket Stadium, in Raipur.

Squads

Points table 

  Qualified to the semi-finals
  Opted out of the tournament
 Australia Legends played 1 match against Sri Lanka Legends and forfeited their remaining matches as they could not travel to India due to COVID-19 restrictions.

Tie-break criteria
 Number of wins.
 Head to head results. If this is not applicable, positions decided by NRR.
 If three or more teams are tied on points and the number of wins, positions decided by NRR.

Postponed and abandoned matches

2020

Final

2021

League stage 

All times are according to Indian Standard Time (IST).

2020

2021

Knockout stage 
The knockout stage started with semi-finals at Raipur, the winners of each progressing to the final at Raipur. If any match ended in a tie, a Super Over would be used to determine the winner. If the scores in the Super Over were also tied, the winner would be determined by another Super Over and continues, until the team wins the Super Over.

On 10 March 2021, Sri Lanka Legends became the first team to qualify for the semi-finals after beating Bangladesh Legends at Raipur. Three days later, saw tournament hosts India Legends, the second team to qualify after they defeated South Africa Legends at Raipur on 13 March 2021. The following day after, South Africa Legends became the third team to qualify after they beat Bangladesh Legends at Raipur on 15 March 2021. The following day, in the final match of the league stage, West Indies Legends and England Legends played for the final spot in the semifinals. Eventually, West Indies Legends became the fourth and final team to qualify for the semi-finals after they beat England Legends in a virtual quarterfinal match.

The first semi-final was played between India Legends and West Indies Legends at Raipur, while the second semi-final was played between Sri Lanka Legends and South Africa Legends at the same venue again.

 All times are according to IST (Indian Standard Time).

Bracket

Semi-finals

Semi-final 1: India Legends v West Indies Legends
The first semi-final between India Legends and West Indies Legends was played at Shaheed Veer Narayan Singh International Cricket Stadium in Raipur on 17 March 2021.

Batting first, India Legends got off to a fantastic start, but lost opener Virender Sehwag, after he gave Indians the perfect start, having scored 35 runs. However, the Indians continued their high scoring rate, as Sachin Tendulkar combined with Mohammad Kaif and Yusuf Pathan for partnerships of 53 and a quick 31 respectively. Tendulkar scored 65 runs before he was the third man out in the 14th over. After his dismissal, Yuvraj Singh combined with Yusuf Pathan for an unbeaten partnership of 78 runs, also scoring a quickfire unbeaten 49* from just 20 deliveries, which included 6 sixes, out of which 4 came in 18th over bowled by Mahendra Nagamootoo. The Indian Legends finished with a score of 218/3, after a fantastic display of batting at the end of their 20 overs.

The West Indies Legends saw William Perkins fell to Manpreet Gony in the second over, but the West Indians scored 71/1 in the first six overs, with Dwayne Smith combining with Narsingh Deonarine going berserk after the Indian bowlers. After a partnership of 99 runs for the second wicket between Dwayne Smith and Narsingh Deonarine, Smith was dismissed for 63. After Kirk Edwards was stumped by Naman Ojha off Pragyan Ojha’s bowling, falling for a first-ball duck, Brian Lara was joined by Narsingh Deonarine for a partnership of 80 runs for the fourth wicket that left West Indies Legends needing 32 runs from the final three overs; however, after the dismissal of Brian Lara and Narsingh Deonarine, within a span of 4 runs and good tight bowling by Vinay Kumar, Manpreet Gony and Irfan Pathan, Indians managed to stop West Indies Legends at 206/6, entering into finals of Road Safety World Series.

Semi-final 2: Sri Lanka Legends v South Africa Legends
The second semi-final saw Sri Lanka Legends take on South Africa Legends at Shaheed Veer Narayan Singh International Cricket Stadium in Raipur on 19 March 2021.

Sri Lanka Legends won the toss and chose to field first. South Africa Legends made a steady start to their innings but lost Andrew Puttick in the third over. Alviro Petersen was joined by Morné van Wyk and combined for a 53 runs partnership. Apart from these batsmen, no other batsman could significantly contribute towards the total as they lost wickets at regular intervals. Nuwan Kulasekara ran through the South African batting lineup and took 5 wickets. Somehow, the South African Legends managed to score 125, with Morné van Wyk top-scoring with 53.

Sri Lanka Legends took their time to get going in the run chase but were soon making progress before Tillakaratne Dilshan was dismissed by Makhaya Ntini for the first wicket. Quick-hitting Sanath Jayasuriya with Upul Tharanga had a small partnership of 39 runs before Petersen dismissed Jayasuriya for 18 runs. Chinthaka Jayasinghe promoted up the order, started to smash bowlers all over the park, while Tharanga played the anchor's role in the chase. The Sri Lankan Legends successfully chased the target with more than two overs to spare and saw them entering the finals against India Legends, to be played on 21 March 2021.

Final

Statistics 
The top 5 players in each category are listed.

Most runs

Most wickets

Broadcasting 
Viacom 18 was the official broadcasting partner of the tournament.
 Colors Cineplex & Rishtey Cineplex broadcast all the games of the tournament, and live streaming was available on Voot and Jio TV.

References

Twenty20 cricket matches
International cricket competitions in 2020–21
Road safety campaigns
Road Safety World Series